The Millewa South railway line, sometimes referred to as the Nowingi-Millewa South railway line was a freight only railway line located in the Millewa region of Victoria, Australia. It branched from Nowingi on the Mildura railway line. Construction began in 1929 and was leased out to Brunswick Plaster Mills to haul Gypsum until January 1988. The line was dismantled in October 1988. The initial intention was to extend the line to Meribah in South Australia, however this never eventuated.

History 
The act to construct the line was passed on the 30th of December, 1927. Construction began in 1929 with a ballast pit siding being provided to supply ballast used on the railway line. It was dismantled in 1938. Loading sites were provided at the 6, 13, 14 and 15 mile posts. Loops were provided at the 10 mile, 18 mile, and 24 mile posts as well. The loops were intended to have passenger platforms and goods sheds, however this never eventuated and all that was constructed were the loops.

In January 1981, the Brunswick Plaster Mills purchased one diesel Victorian Railways M class – M232.

In 1942, the track beyond the 15 mile loading site was dismantled, everything else along the line was dismantled in the 1980s.

References 

Closed regional railway lines in Victoria (Australia)
Railway lines opened in 1930
Railway lines closed in 1988